Rose Harbour is an unincorporated settlement on the north coast of Kunghit Island, on the south shore of the Houston Stewart Channel, in Haida Gwaii.  It is within the bounds of Gwaii Haanas National Park Reserve and Haida Heritage Site. It is the only privately-owned property within Gwaii Haanas.

Rose Harbour was established as a whaling station in 1910 by the Queen Charlotte Whaling Company and operated until 1943.  A monument survives to Chinese and Japanese people who died in the whaling trade.

Currently, there is a small group of houses at Rose Harbour, which offer lodging and dining services to kayakers and other tourists.

Images

References

Populated places in Haida Gwaii